Loach may refer to:
 Fishes of the superfamily Cobitoidea, bottom-dwelling freshwater fishes with several barbels near the mouth, found in Eurasia and northwestern Africa, related to minnows
Algae eaters, fishes of the family Gyrinocheilidae, are sometimes referred to as sucking loaches
 Ken Loach (born 1936), English film director
 Scott Loach (born 1988), English footballer
 Light Observation Helicopter (LOH, pronounced as loach) U.S. Army helicopter program
 "Loach", colloquial name of the Hughes OH-6 Cayuse military helicopter

ja:ローチ